Lake Local School District may refer to:

Lake Local School District (Stark County), Stark County, Ohio
Lake Local School District (Wood County), Wood County, Ohio